Gazeta Grodzieńska was a weekly Polish language newspaper published in Grodno, Polish–Lithuanian Commonwealth. It was first published in 1776 and lasted till 1783. It covered news about the Commonwealth.

References

Publications established in 1776
Polish-language newspapers